Honaker is a surname. Notable people with the surname include:

 Charlie Honaker (1899–1974), American football player
 Lombe Honaker (1888–1964), American college football and basketball player
 Sam Honaker (1887–1966), American football player
 Michael Honaker (born 1965), West Virginia politician